Newsmax TV is an American conservative television channel owned by Newsmax. The network primarily focuses on opinion-based talk shows. It carries a news/talk format throughout the day and night, with documentaries and films on weekends. During and after the 2020 United States presidential election, it grew rapidly by broadcasting conspiracy theories and baseless allegations of voter fraud.

The channel was created by American journalist and Newsmax CEO Christopher Ruddy. It launched on June 16, 2014, to 35 million satellite subscribers through DirecTV and Dish Network. As of May 2019, the network reaches about 75 million cable homes and has wide streaming and digital media player/mobile device availability. The channel primarily broadcasts from Newsmax's New York studio on Manhattan's East Side, with headquarters in Boca Raton, Florida and Washington, D.C.

Newsmax TV holds a conservative political stance, broadcasting many programs hosted by conservative media personalities. CEO Christopher Ruddy has compared the network to Fox News. The company has hired many former Fox News Channel program hosts, including Greg Kelly, Rob Schmitt, Bob Sellers, and Heather Childers. The Washington Post has described Newsmax as "a landing spot for cable news personalities in need of a new home", citing the network's airing of Mark Halperin and Bill O'Reilly following their resignations from other networks due to allegations of sexual harassment.

History

Network launch
In May 2014, U.S. news organization Newsmax announced that it had signed a distribution deal with DirecTV and would launch a national television news channel to compete directly with CNN, Fox News, and other American news networks. It was launched to provide independent news; its founder, Chris Ruddy described it as intended to be a "kinder, gentler Fox News," saying that "Our goal is to be a little more boomer-oriented, more information-based rather than being vituperative and polarizing."

Around the time of the channel launch, Businessweek Bloomberg profiled Ruddy and Newsmax in a feature story entitled "The Next Ailes: Newsmax's Chris Ruddy Preps TV Rival to Fox News. Businessweek Bloomberg reported that Newsmax planned to build off its success as a digital media player to challenge Fox News in the traditional cable arena while developing a stake in the emerging streaming OTT business.

A Fast Company report in December 2020 suggested Newsmax was on a course to "dethrone" Fox with its streaming digital strategy by offering the channel for free to platforms like Roku, YouTube, Pluto TV, Xumo, Samsung TV Plus and others. "You wouldn't know it by looking at cable TV ratings, but Fox News has a problem on its hands," Fast Company wrote, noting that "When you factor in Newsmax's streaming audience, the race between the two right-wing news networks is closer than you might think."

On January 16, 2016, Dennis Michael Lynch: Unfiltered debuted on the channel. The program ended after the first segment of the August 10, 2016, episode after Lynch announced that he would resign from the network and made comments defending Fox News Channel and criticizing his network for its reporting of the Trump campaign and suggesting they were restricting his editorial control; he was escorted out from the network's New York studio during what would have been the first commercial break. It was replaced the next Monday with an hour-long video simulcast of radio's The Howie Carr Show from WRKO in Boston.

Beginning in 2020, the network significantly ramped up programming, adding evening shows with Greg Kelly, a former Fox News and local affiliate host, and Grant Stinchfield, a former NBC local correspondent and ex-NRA TV host. The network launched Spicer & Co. on March 3, 2020, featuring former Trump White House Press Secretary Sean Spicer and co-host Lyndsay Keith, Historically, the network started out with a documentary-heavy lineup, but as of 2022, replays of daily and weekend shows make up the bulk of the network's late night programming, like most news channels.

2020 election 
During the 2020 United States presidential election, then-President Trump began to promote Newsmax over rival competitor Fox News. Trump's preference for Newsmax over Fox News became clearer after the latter became the first news outlet to call Arizona for Democratic challenger Joe Biden. Newsmax has made their more conservative leanings a selling point to disaffected Fox News viewers, as well as employing Fox News alumni to join their lineup on Newsmax TV, such as Rob Schmitt and Greg Kelly.

After the election was won by Democrat Joe Biden, Newsmax struck a defiant tone, focusing on conspiracy theories and allegations of voter fraud as a way to attract Fox News viewers angered by what they saw as insufficient loyalty to Trump. Emily VanDerWerff of Vox reported that the outlet did not "go full arch-conservative" and "doesn't give airtime to QAnon paranoiacs", but that it "spent lots of time arguing that other media outlets jumped the gun in calling the election for Biden and that Trump still has a path to win this thing." Newsmax was thus positioned further to the right of Fox but less so than One America News Network, another conservative news channel that embraced a far-right editorial stance during and after the Trump administration.

CNN's Brian Stelter, in an on-air interview, asked Newsmax CEO Christopher Ruddy why the network chose to air "election denialism" and "bogus voter fraud stuff," to which Ruddy replied that the network featured all points of view and argued that all of the other major news outlets who had reported Biden's election win were "rushing."

2021–present 
Since the election, Newsmax has seen increasing viewership; according to Nielsen, Newsmax averaged 182,000 viewers in the week leading up to the election. In the week that followed, the average increased further with daily averages around 400,000 viewers, with Greg Kelly Reports and Spicer & Co. having attracted numbers in the 700,000–800,000 range. On December 7, 2020, Greg Kelly Reports beat its timeslot competitor on Fox News, The Story with Martha MacCallum, in average key demographic viewership for the first time (229,000 to 203,000), while Stelter observed that overall the program "has nearly a million viewers on a good night".

A small number of cable providers, including Breezeline (formerly Atlantic Broadband), dropped the channel in January 2022, noting the channel's wide free availability on streaming advertising-supported video-on-demand platforms, and that their drop of the channel came due to paid carriage being required by Newsmax TV, not its content.

As of October 2022, Newsmax was in a distant fourth place among the cable news channels, behind Fox News, CNN and MSNBC but ahead of NewsNation.

On January 25, 2023, Newsmax TV was removed from DirecTV and U-verse after the end of their current carriage agreement, as the network sought to convert from paying DirecTV for carriage to a more traditional retransmission consent arrangement with compensation. DirecTV subsequently replaced Newsmax TV with the competing conservative network The First TV. The decision was criticized by Newsmax CEO Christopher Ruddy, Republican lawmakers, and Florida governor Ron DeSantis, who argued that the removal was an act of deplatforming and censorship. DirecTV is under no obligation to carry Newsmax TV; U.S. law relating to cable network carriage only deals in preventing television providers from giving co-owned networks favourable treatment over others.

Notable personalities

Program hosts
Weekdays
 Eric Bolling: host of Eric Bolling The Balance
 Rob Finnerty: co-host of Wake Up America
 Greg Kelly: host of Greg Kelly Reports
 Bob Sellers: host of American Agenda
 Rob Schmitt: host of Rob Schmitt Tonight
 Sean Spicer: co-host of Spicer & Co.
 Greta Van Susteren: host of The Record

Weekends
 Tom Basile: host of America Right Now and fill-in host, former co-host of Wake Up America Weekend
 Nancy Brinker: host of Conversations with Nancy Brinker
 Rita Cosby: host of Saturday Report
 Sebastian Gorka: host of The Gorka Reality Check 
 Carl Higbie: host of Wake Up America Weekend 
 Mike Huckabee: host of Huckabee (shared with TBN)
 Benny Johnson: host of The Benny Report
 Mark Kaye: host of The Mark Kaye Show
 Dick Morris: host of Dick Morris Democracy

Correspondents and substitute anchors
 Heather Childers
 Bianca de la Garza
 Chuck Holton – foreign correspondent
 Betsy McCaughey – fill-in host
 James Rosen – Chief White House correspondent

Previous
 Steve Bannon – host of War Room (moved to Real America's Voice)
 Herman Cain – was slated to host a show for Newsmax TV but died of coronavirus disease before making it to series
 Howie Carr – host of The Howie Carr Show (now radio-only)
 Callista Gingrich – former host of Let Freedom Ring
 J. D. Hayworth – former host of Newsmax Prime and America's Forum
 Dennis Michael Lynch – former host of Dennis Michael Lynch: Unfiltered
 Michelle Malkin – former host of Michelle Malkin Sovereign Nation
 Steve Malzberg – former host of America Talks Live and The Steve Malzberg Show
 Bill O'Reilly – host of No Spin News with Bill O'Reilly (since moved to The F1rst)
 Joe Pags – host of The Joe Pags Show (now radio-only)
 Joe Pinion – former host of Saturday Agenda and fill-in host
 Wayne Allyn Root – host of The Wayne Allyn Root Show (now radio-only)
 Jesse Lee Peterson – host of The Jesse Lee Peterson Show (now radio-only)
 Todd Schnitt – former host of The Schnitt Show

Terrestrial affiliates

Newsmax TV mainly depends on its carriage on cable services for viewership, along with streaming on their website and open digital media player platforms such as Roku and in the UK via online video subscription service NewsPlayer+. It has historically made its feed available to free-to-air terrestrial television affiliates, but those affiliations as of 2021 have mostly been discontinued, except for a single affiliate in Alexandria, Minnesota, which carries the Newsmax feed as part of Selective TV's slate of cable and terrestrial stations to the Alexandria area.

Current affiliates

Former affiliates

References

2014 establishments in the United States
Television networks in the United States
English-language television stations in the United States
Conservative media in the United States
Television channels and stations established in 2014
Television news in the United States